Nationality words link to articles with information on the nation's poetry or literature (for instance, Irish or France).

Events

 A small plaque is set on the Statue of Liberty to display Emma Lazarus' 1883 poem, "The New Colossus"
 The first Nobel Prize in Literature is awarded to Sully Prudhomme, a French poet and essayist.

Works published in English

Canada
 Bliss Carman, with Richard Hovey, Last Songs from Vagabondia, Canadian author published in the United States
 William Henry Drummond, Johnnie Courteau and other Poems.
 Charles Mair, Tecumseh: A Drama, and Canadian Poems, published in Toronto

United Kingdom
 Jane Barlow, Ghost-Bereft, with Other Stories and Studies in Verse
 C. S. Calverley, Complete Works (posthumous)
 John Davidson
 The Testament of a Man Forbid
 The Testament of a Vivisector
 Thomas Hardy, Poems of the Past and the Present (published November 1901; book states "1902")
 Laurence Hope, The Garden of Kama (U.K. title), India's Love Lyrics (U.S. title).
 George Meredith, A Reading of Life with Other Poems
 Lady Margaret Sackville, Poems

United States
 Bliss Carman, with Richard Hovey, Last Songs from Vagabondia, Canadian author published in the United States
 Nina Davis, translator, Songs of Exile by Hebrew Poets, English translator of medieval Hebrew poetry published in the United States
 Edwin Markham, Lincoln and Other Poems
 William Vaughn Moody, Poems
 George Santayana, A Hermit of Carmel and Other Poems

Other in English
 Joseph Furtado, Poems, Bombay; India, Indian poetry in English
 Louise Mack, Dreams in Flower, Australia

Works published in other languages
 Hayim Nahman Bialik, שירים, Hebrew published in Warsaw
 José Santos Chocano, El fin de Satán y otros poemas (The End of Satan' and Other Poems), Peru
 Stefan George, Die Fibel, poems written from 1886 to 1889; German
 Francis Jammes, Le Deuil des primevères, France
 Ardoshir Faramji Kharbardar, Kavyarasika (Indian Parsi writing in Gujarati)
 Beheramji Malabari, Kavyarasika, (Indian writing in Gujarati)
 Vazha-Pshavela, The Snake-eater, Georgian

Births
Death years link to the corresponding "[year] in poetry" article:
 January 16 – Laura Riding Jackson (died 1991), American poet, critic, novelist, essayist and short story writer
 January 29 – Heinrich Anacker (died 1971), German
 January 30 – Hans Erich Nossack (died 1977), German
 March 4? – Jean-Joseph Rabearivelo, born Joseph-Casimir Rabearivelo or Rebearivelo (died 1937), Madagascar native and French-language poet
 March 5 – Yocheved Bat-Miriam (died 1979), Russian-born, Israeli, Hebrew-language poet
 March 27 – Kenneth Slessor (died 1971), Australian newspaper journalist and poet
 April 20 – Michel Leiris, French author and poet
 April 29 – Hirohito (died 1989), Emperor of Japan and poet
 May 1 – Sterling Brown (died 1989) African-American teacher, poet, writer on folklore and literary critic
 May 30 – Itsik Manger (or "Itzig Manger") איציק מאַנגער (died 1969), Yiddish poet and playwright born in Ukraine, a resident in Romania and Poland, then an immigrant to Israel
 June 3 – G. Sankara Kurup (died 1978), Indian Malayalam-language poet
 June 10 – Eric Maschwitz (died 1969), English entertainer, writer, broadcaster, broadcasting executive and poet
 June 13 – J. C. Beaglehole (died 1971), New Zealand historian and poet
 July 1 – Vladimir Lugovskoy (or "Lugovskoi") (died 1957), Russian Constructivist poet
 July 26 – Nina Berberova, Нина Николаевна Берберова (died 1993), Russian-born poet, novelist, playwright, critic and academic who lived in Europe from 1922 to 1950, then in the United States
 August 5 – Margarita Abella Caprile (died 1960), Argentine poet 
 August 12 – Robert Francis (died 1987), American
 August 20 – Salvatore Quasimodo (died 1968), Italian poet
 September 2 – Andreas Embirikos (died 1975), Greek
 September 23 – Jaroslav Seifert (died 1986), Czech, Nobel Prize-winning poet and journalist
 September 28 – T. Inglis Moore (died 1978), Australian
 September 29 – Lanza del Vasto (died 1981), French poet and novelist
 October 2 – Roy Campbell (died 1957), South African poet and translator
 October 4 – Adrian Bell (died 1980), English rural writer and crossword compiler
 Also:
 Heinz Helmerking (died 1964), German writer
 Kilian Kerst (died 1981), German
 Sankara Kurup (died 1978), Indian, Malayalam-language poet
 Hans Lorber (died 1973), German
 Amin Nakhla (died 1976), Lebanese, Arabic language poet
 Irina Odoyevtseva, also "Odoevtseva" also "Iraida Gustavovna Beinlke Ivanova" (more probably born 1895; died 1990), Russian
 Louis Paul, born Leroi Placet (approximate date of birth; died 1970), American fiction writer
 Vladimir Aleksandrovich Smolensky or "Smolenskii" (died 1961), Russian
 Shinkichi Takahashi (died 1987), Japanese Dadaist poet

Deaths
 June 10 – Robert Williams Buchanan, 59, Scottish poet, novelist and dramatist
 July 20 – William Cosmo Monkhouse, 61 (born 1840), English poet and critic
 July 23/24 – Andreas Laskaratos (born 1811), Greek poet
 October 18 – Nicholas Flood Davin, 61 (born 1840), Irish-born Canadian lawyer, journalist, politician and poet
 November 10 – Sarah Carmichael (born 1838), American poet
 December 23 – William Ellery Channing, 73, American Transcendentalist poet
 Also:
 Albery Allson Whitman (born 1851), African American poet and orator

Awards and honors

See also

 20th-century French literature
 20th century in poetry
 20th century in literature
 List of years in literature
 Poetry
 List of years in poetry
 Silver Age of Russian Poetry
 Victorian literature
 Young Poland (Młoda Polska) a modernist period in Polish arts and literature, roughly from 1890 to 1918

Notes

Poetry
20th-century poetry